The 545th Brigade Engineer Battalion is a combat engineer battalion in the Oklahoma Army National Guard, part of the 45th Infantry Brigade Combat Team. It was reorganized from the Special Troops Battalion, 45th Infantry Brigade Combat Team and is headquartered in Norman, Oklahoma. It is the newest battalion in the brigade.

Commanders and command sergeants major
Commanders
LTC Van Kinchen 2007-2008
LTC John Landreth 2008-2009
LTC Michael Kinnison 2009-2011
LTC Thomas Mancino 2011–2013
LTC Douglas Merritt 2013-2014
LTC Hiram Tabler 2014-2015
LTC Cory Newcomb 2015–2018
LTC Elmer Bruner 2018-2019
LTC Michael Vanoni 2019-present

Command sergeants major
CSM Joe Stover 2007-2011
CSM Gordon Carlin 2011–2012
CSM Bryon Fry 2012-2013
CSM Brian Miller 2013-2015
CSM Robert Apala 2015-2015
CSM Douglas Kimberlin 2015–2018
CSM Scott Catlett 2018-2021
CSM Shannon Carter 2021-present

Former subordinate units
Headquarters and Headquarters Company, Special Troops Battalion, 45th IBCT at Norman, OK
Company A (Combat Engineer), Special Troops Battalion, 45th IBCT at Broken Arrow, OK
Company B (Military Intelligence), Special Troops Battalion, 45th IBCT at Norman, OK
Company C (Signal), Special Troops Battalion, 45th IBCT (Signal) at Norman, OK

Deployments
Global War on Terror
Operation Noble Eagle
Pine Bluff Arsenal (245 ENG)
Operation Iraqi Freedom
Iraq Surge (245 ENG, 245 MI)
Operation Enduring Freedom
Afghanistan Consolidation III
Afghanistan Transition I

History and lineage
The Special Troops Battalion, 45th IBCT was formed from new and existing units of the 45th Infantry Brigade Combat Team and received federal recognition on 25 December 2010.  Existing units were the 245th Engineer Company, re-designated Company A, and the 245th Military Intelligence Company, re-designated Company B.  New elements would be the Headquarters Company, itself composed largely of platoon and smaller elements of the Brigade Headquarters Company, such as the Military Police and CBRN platoons, and Company C, the new Network Support Company (Signal). A special troops battalion, in the modular Army organization, is a collection of units company size and smaller, that contain specialties other than that of the primary function of the Brigade or Division it is assigned to.  An infantry STB is composed of an engineer company, a military intelligence company, and a signal company, with a headquarters company that contains support, security, military police and medical platoons and sections.

The battalion motto, "All In," is emblematic of the wide variety of expertise, missions, and capabilities brought together under the battalion's aegis.

The STB deployed with the brigade under the command of LTC Tommy Mancino, to Afghanistan in 2011 and in an unprecedented move was made a battlespace owner in Laghman Province in Eastern Afghanistan. By leveraging its troops' unique skill sets, a few attachments, and the use of combat multipliers available in the theater, the STB conducted combat operations to a high degree of lethality and suffered no fatalities, and still provided the usual support functions it was designed for. Company A (Engineer) conducted thousands of miles of route clearance operations, Company B (MI) collected and analyzed intelligence for the brigade and flew UAV surveillance missions, and Company C (Signal) was present all across the brigade's area of operations, providing critical connectivity and communications, all while also meeting other needs of the brigade, such as force protection on a myriad of small bases and outposts. The STB returned from Afghanistan as part of the 45th Infantry Brigade Combat Team in 2012.

Distinctive unit insignia
Description A Gold color metal and enamel device 1 3/16 inches (3.02 cm) in height overall consisting of a shield blazoned as follows: Per chevron Gules and Azure (Teal Blue), a chevron embattled Or, in chief a musket, barrel up and key, ward up turned to base saltirewise, in base a stylized Thunderbird displayed with wings inverted all of the last with an eye of the field, charged with a lightning bolt of the first. Attached across the bottom of the shield is a Gold wavy scroll inscribed "ALL IN" in Black letters.

Symbolism The Thunderbird, powerful, vigilant and swift, and the colors red and yellow (gold) are adapted from the Brigade's shoulder sleeve insignia. Red and yellow reflect the Spanish heritage and the Thunderbird signifies the warrior spirit of the Battalion. The musket represents the Infantry branch which the Battalion supports. The key is for the Military Intelligence Company. The castle of the Engineer Corps is symbolized by the embattled chevron and the lightning bolt is for the Signal Company. The shield and its elements emphasize the defense, combat readiness and teamwork of the unit.

Background The distinctive unit insignia was approved on 21 April 2010.

Campaign participation credit
Global War on Terror

Operation Enduring Freedom

Afghanistan, Consolidation III
Afghanistan, Transition I

Battlefield or campaign honors, citations and decorations
Company A, previously the 245th Engineer Company, entitled to the Meritorious Unit Citation.   DAGO 233-24 (2009)

References

045
045
045
045 Army
Military units and formations established in 2008